The Papyrus of Ani is a papyrus manuscript in the form of a scroll with cursive hieroglyphs and color illustrations that was created c. 1250 BCE, during the Nineteenth Dynasty of the New Kingdom of ancient Egypt. Egyptians compiled an individualized book for certain people upon their death, called the Book of Going Forth by Day, more commonly known as the Book of the Dead, typically containing declarations and spells to help the deceased in their afterlife. The Papyrus of Ani is the manuscript compiled for the Theban scribe Ani.

The scroll was discovered in Luxor in 1888 by Egyptians trading in illegal antiquities. It was acquired by E. A. Wallis Budge, as described in his autobiography By Nile and Tigris. Shortly after Budge first saw the papyrus, Egyptian police arrested several antiquities dealers and sealed up their houses, one of which contained the objects Budge had purchased from the dealers. Budge distracted the guards by offering them a meal while locals tunneled under the house's walls to retrieve the objects, including the Papyrus of Ani. Stored in several custom tin boxes, the papyrus and other objects Budge had acquired were then smuggled to the principal librarian at the British Museum.  
Budge was afterward paid a 150GBP "gratuity" from the British Treasury on behalf of the British Museum for acquiring the papyrus.
It is considered to be the finest extant example of the Egyptian Book of the Dead.

Contents

Note: Divisions vary based on compilations; Sections are groups of related sentences; Titles are not original to the text.

See also
List of ancient Egyptian papyri
Maat: 42 Negative Confessions (Papyrus of Ani)

References

Further reading 

The Egyptian Book of the Dead: The Book of Going Forth by Day, The First Authentic Presentation of the Complete "Papyrus of Ani", Introduction and commentary by Dr. Ogden Goelet, Translation  by Dr. Raymond O. Faulkner, Preface by Carol Andrews, Featuring Integrated Text and Full Color Images, (Chronicle Books, San Francisco) c1994, Rev. ed. c1998.  Contains: Map Key to the Papyrus, Commentary by Dr. Ogden Goelet, Selected Bibliography, and "Glossary of Terms and Concepts"
 Eternal Egypt: Masterworks of Ancient Art from the British Museum, Edna Russmann
 The Egyptian Book of the Dead: (The Papyrus of Ani), (Dover Ed., New York), c1895, Dover ed., 1967.  Egyptian Text Transliteration and Translation, Introduction, etc. by Sir E.A.Wallis Budge
 Facsimile: Papyrus Ani: Akademische Druck- u. Verlagsanstalt (ADEVA), Graz 1978. Complete colour facsimile edition of the 37 segments of the papyrus in original size (approx. 24 x 0,38 m); average size of the segments 380 x 700 mm. Scholarly commentary (in German): E. Dondelinger, Koblenz. This facsimile edition is available either in a portfolio (= standard edition) or in a book case that can be used as a desk (= special edition) - CODICES SELECTI, Vol. LXII

External links

 The papyrus of Ani; a reproduction in facsimile by Budge, E. A. W. in three volumes.
 (introductory analysis).
 (transcription and translation).
 (facsimile reproduction).
The Egyptian Book of the Dead.

Book of the Dead
13th-century BC works
Ancient Egyptian objects in the British Museum
Egyptian papyri containing images